Andrés Vombergar (born 20 November 1994) is a professional footballer who plays as a forward for Argentine Primera División club San Lorenzo. Born in Argentina, he represents the Slovenian national team internationally.

Club career
Vombergar began his senior career with Ituzaingó in 2014. In early 2015, he moved to Fénix, where he played for two seasons and scored a total of 14 league goals. In 2016, Vombergar was loaned to Los Andes.

On 28 July 2017, Vombergar signed a contract with Slovenian club Olimpija Ljubljana. In February 2019, Vombergar signed a three-and-a-half year contract with the Russian team Ufa.

On 14 September 2020, Ufa announced his return to Olimpija. In July 2021, Vombergar joined Mexican side Atlético San Luis for an alleged transfer fee of €300,000.

In July 2022, Vombergar joined San Lorenzo on a contract until 31 December 2023.

Honours
Olimpija Ljubljana
Slovenian PrvaLiga: 2017–18
Slovenian Cup: 2017–18, 2020–21

References

External links
 
 NZS profile 

1994 births
Living people
Argentine people of Slovenian descent
Argentine footballers
Slovenian footballers
Slovenia international footballers
Slovenian expatriate footballers
Association football forwards
Club Atlético Ituzaingó players
Club Atlético Fénix players
Club Atlético Los Andes footballers
NK Olimpija Ljubljana (2005) players
FC Ufa players
Atlético San Luis footballers
San Lorenzo de Almagro footballers
Primera Nacional players
Slovenian PrvaLiga players
Russian Premier League players
Liga MX players
Argentine Primera División players
Expatriate footballers in Russia
Slovenian expatriate sportspeople in Russia
Expatriate footballers in Mexico